Tell Me Everything may refer to:

 Tell Me Everything (album), a 2008 album by Ernst Reijseger
 Tell Me Everything (TV series), an upcoming ITV2 teen drama series
 Tell Me Everything (film), an upcoming Netflix film